A New Literary History of America is an anthology of essays edited by Greil Marcus and Werner Sollors. Its roughly 200 essays span a range of topics that the editors selected as a sample of the different voices and perspectives on North America since the genesis of the European concept of a New World.

References

2009 non-fiction books
2009 anthologies
Essay anthologies
21st-century history books
American history books
History books about literature
History books about the United States